Det norske Theater is a former theatre in Bergen, Norway, and regarded as the first pure Norwegian stage theatre. The theatre's first production was Holberg's comedy Den Vægelsindede, and the opening was on 2 January 1850. The theatre played at the old comedy house built in 1800.

In 1876 the theatre Den Nationale Scene opened in the same building.

References 

Former theatres in Norway
1850 establishments in Norway
1863 disestablishments in Norway
19th century in Bergen